Loko, or Landogo, is a Southwestern Mande language spoken by the Loko people, who primarily live in Northern Sierra Leone. There are two known dialects, Landogo and Logo, which are mutually intelligible. Ethnic Loko outnumber native Loko speakers due to the linguistic encroachment of Temne and Krio and urbanization to Freetown, where Loko is internally and externally seen as a low-prestige language.

Citations

References
Kimball, Les. 1983. A description of the grammar of Loko. Freetown. Institute for Sierra Leonean Languages.
Innes, Gordon. 1964. An outline grammar of Loko with texts. African Language Studies, pp. 115-178.

Languages of Sierra Leone
Mande languages
Loko people
Endangered languages of Africa